The Zabriskie-Kipp-Cadmus House is located in Teaneck, Bergen County, New Jersey, United States. The house was built in 1751 and added to the National Register of Historic Places on December 13, 1978.

See also
National Register of Historic Places listings in Bergen County, New Jersey

References

Houses on the National Register of Historic Places in New Jersey
Houses completed in 1751
Houses in Bergen County, New Jersey
National Register of Historic Places in Bergen County, New Jersey
Teaneck, New Jersey
New Jersey Register of Historic Places
Stone houses in New Jersey
1751 establishments in the Thirteen Colonies